Shingo Kunieda defeated Gustavo Fernández in the final, 7–6(7–5), 6–0 to win the men's singles wheelchair tennis title at the 2018 French Open. It was his seventh French Open singles title and 22nd major singles title overall.

Alfie Hewett was the defending champion, but was defeated by Gordon Reid in the quarterfinals.

Seeds

Draw

Finals

References
 Draw

Wheelchair Men's Singles
French Open, 2018 Men's Singles